Napoleon J. Nelson, Sr. is an American politician. He is a Democrat representing District 154 in the Pennsylvania House of Representatives.

Early life

Nelson attended Central High School and graduated in 1998. He then graduated from the Massachusetts Institute of Technology in 2002 with a Bachelor of Science in Computer Science, and earned an MBA from the Wharton School of the University of Pennsylvania in 2007.

Political career

Nelson served as Board Director for the Cheltenham school district from 2011 to 2017, and became the Finance Officer for Cheltenham Township, Pennsylvania in 2018.

In 2019, former state representative Steve McCarter announced that he would not seek re-election in 2020, and Nelson ran for the open seat. He won a six-way Democratic primary with 39.2% of the vote, and went on to win the general election with 77.5% of the vote. He assumed office on December 1, 2020, becoming the first black state representative for Pennsylvania's 154th District. Nelson currently sits on the Aging & Older Adult Services, Children & Youth, Education, and Finance committees.

Electoral record

References 

Year of birth missing (living people)
Living people
Democratic Party members of the Pennsylvania House of Representatives
21st-century American politicians